A sub-orbital spaceflight is a spaceflight in which the spacecraft reaches outer space, but its trajectory intersects the atmosphere or surface of the gravitating body from which it was launched, so that it will not complete one orbital revolution (it does not become an artificial satellite) or reach escape velocity.

For example, the path of an object launched from Earth that reaches the Kármán line (at ) above sea level, and then falls back to Earth, is considered a sub-orbital spaceflight. Some sub-orbital flights have been undertaken to test spacecraft and launch vehicles later intended for orbital spaceflight. Other vehicles are specifically designed only for sub-orbital flight; examples include crewed vehicles, such as the X-15 and SpaceShipOne, and uncrewed ones, such as ICBMs and sounding rockets.

Flights which attain sufficient velocity to go into low Earth orbit, and then de-orbit before completing their first full orbit, are not considered sub-orbital. Examples of this include Yuri Gagarin's Vostok 1, and flights of the Fractional Orbital Bombardment System.

A flight that does not reach space is still sometimes called suborbital, but is not a 'suborbital spaceflight'. Usually a rocket is used, but experimental sub-orbital spaceflight has also been achieved with a space gun.

Altitude requirement

This altitude, known as the Kármán line, was chosen by the Fédération Aéronautique Internationale because it is roughly the point where a vehicle flying fast enough to support itself with aerodynamic lift from the Earth's atmosphere would be flying faster than orbital speed. The US military and NASA award astronaut wings to those flying above , although the U.S. State Department appears not to support a distinct boundary between atmospheric flight and spaceflight.

Orbit
During freefall the trajectory is part of an elliptic orbit as given by the orbit equation. The perigee distance is less than the radius of the Earth R including atmosphere, hence the ellipse intersects the Earth, and hence the spacecraft will fail to complete an orbit. The major axis is vertical, the semi-major axis a is more than R/2. The specific orbital energy  is given by:

where  is the standard gravitational parameter.

Almost always a < R, corresponding to a lower  than the minimum for a full orbit, which is 

Speed, range, and altitude
To minimize the required delta-v (an astrodynamical measure which strongly determines the required fuel), the high-altitude part of the flight is made with the rockets off (this is technically called free-fall even for the upward part of the trajectory). (Compare with Oberth effect.) The maximum speed in a flight is attained at the lowest altitude of this free-fall trajectory, both at the start and at the end of it.

If one's goal is simply to "reach space", for example in competing for the Ansari X Prize, horizontal motion is not needed. In this case the lowest required delta-v, to reach 100 km altitude, is about 1.4 km/s. Moving slower, with less free-fall, would require more delta-v.

Compare this with orbital spaceflights: a low Earth orbit (LEO), with an altitude of about 300 km, needs a speed around 7.7 km/s, requiring a delta-v of about 9.2 km/s. (If there were no atmospheric drag the theoretical minimum delta-v would be 8.1 km/s to put a craft into a 300-km high orbit starting from a stationary point like the South Pole. The theoretical minimum can be up to 0.46 km/s less if launching eastward from near the equator.)

For sub-orbital spaceflights covering a horizontal distance the maximum speed and required delta-v are in between those of a vertical flight and a LEO. The maximum speed at the lower ends of the trajectory are now composed of a horizontal and a vertical component. The higher the horizontal distance covered, the greater the horizontal speed will be. (The vertical velocity will increase with distance for short distances but will decrease with distance at longer distances.) For the V-2 rocket, just reaching space but with a range of about 330 km, the maximum speed was 1.6 km/s. Scaled Composites SpaceShipTwo which is under development will have a similar free-fall orbit but the announced maximum speed is 1.1 km/s (perhaps because of engine shut-off at a higher altitude).

For larger ranges, due to the elliptic orbit the maximum altitude can be much more than for a LEO. On a 10,000-km intercontinental flight, such as that of an intercontinental ballistic missile or possible future commercial spaceflight, the maximum speed is about 7 km/s, and the maximum altitude may be more than 1300 km.
Any spaceflight that returns to the surface, including sub-orbital ones, will undergo atmospheric reentry. The speed at the start of the reentry is basically the maximum speed of the flight. The aerodynamic heating caused will vary accordingly: it is much less for a flight with a maximum speed of only 1 km/s than for one with a maximum speed of 7 or 8 km/s.

The minimum delta-v and the corresponding maximum altitude for a given range can be calculated, d, assuming a spherical Earth of circumference  and neglecting the Earth's rotation and atmosphere. Let θ be half the angle that the projectile is to go around the Earth, so in degrees it is 45°×d/. The minimum-delta-v trajectory corresponds to an ellipse with one focus at the centre of the Earth and the other at the point halfway between the launch point and the destination point (somewhere inside the Earth). (This is the orbit that minimizes the semi-major axis, which is equal to the sum of the distances from a point on the orbit to the two foci. Minimizing the semi-major axis minimizes the specific orbital energy and thus the delta-v, which is the speed of launch.) Geometrical arguments lead then to the following (with R being the radius of the Earth, about 6370 km):

Note that the altitude of apogee is maximized (at about 1320 km) for a trajectory going one quarter of the way around the Earth. Longer ranges will have lower apogees in the minimal-delta-v solution.

(where g is the acceleration of gravity at the Earth's surface). The Δv increases with range, leveling off at 7.9 km/s as the range approaches  (halfway around the world). The minimum-delta-v trajectory for going halfway around the world corresponds to a circular orbit just above the surface (of course in reality it would have to be above the atmosphere). See lower for the time of flight.

An intercontinental ballistic missile is defined as a missile that can hit a target at least 5500 km away, and according to the above formula this requires an initial speed of 6.1 km/s. Increasing the speed to 7.9 km/s to attain any point on Earth requires a considerably larger missile because the amount of fuel needed goes up exponentially with delta-v (see Rocket equation).

The initial direction of a minimum-delta-v trajectory points halfway between straight up and straight toward the destination point (which is below the horizon). Again, this is the case if the Earth's rotation is ignored. It is not exactly true for a rotating planet unless the launch takes place at a pole.

Flight duration
In a vertical flight of not too high altitudes, the time of the free-fall is both for the upward and for the downward part the maximum speed divided by the acceleration of gravity, so with a maximum speed of 1 km/s together 3 minutes and 20 seconds. The duration of the flight phases before and after the free-fall can vary.

For an intercontinental flight the boost phase takes 3 to 5 minutes, the free-fall (midcourse phase) about 25 minutes. For an ICBM the atmospheric reentry phase takes about 2 minutes; this will be longer for any soft landing, such as for a possible future commercial flight.

Sub-orbital flights can last from just seconds to days. Pioneer 1 was NASA's first space probe, intended to reach the Moon. A partial failure caused it to instead follow a sub-orbital trajectory, reentering the Earth's atmosphere 43 hours after launch.

To calculate the time of flight for a minimum-delta-v trajectory, according to Kepler's third law, the period for the entire orbit (if it didn't go through the Earth) would be:

Using Kepler's second law, we multiply this by the portion of the area of the ellipse swept by the line from the centre of the Earth to the projectile:

This gives about 32 minutes for going a quarter of the way around the Earth, and 42 minutes for going halfway around.

From the form involving arccosine, the derivative of the time of flight with respect to d (or θ) goes to zero as d approaches  (halfway around the world). The derivative of Δv also goes to zero here.

Flight profiles

While there are a great many possible sub-orbital flight profiles, it is expected that some will be more common than others.

Ballistic missiles
The first sub-orbital vehicles which reached space were ballistic missiles. Then in the late 1940s the US and USSR concurrently developed missiles all of which were based on the V-2 Rocket, and then much longer range Intercontinental Ballistic Missiles (ICBMs). There are now many countries who possess ICBMs and even more with shorter range Intermediate Range Ballistic Missiles (IRBMs).

Tourist flights
Sub-orbital tourist flights will initially focus on attaining the altitude required to qualify as reaching space. The flight path will be either vertical or very steep, with the spacecraft landing back at its take-off site.

The spacecraft will shut off its engines well before reaching maximum altitude, and then coast up to its highest point. During a few minutes, from the point when the engines are shut off to the point where the atmosphere begins to slow down the downward acceleration, the passengers will experience weightlessness.

Megaroc had been planned for sub-orbital spaceflight by the British Interplanetary Society in the 1940s.

In the autumn of 1945, the group M. Tikhonravov K. and N. G. Chernysheva at NII-4 rocket artillery Academy of Sciences technology on its own initiative the first stratospheric rocket project was developed by VR-190 for vertical flight two pilots to an altitude of 200 km based on captured German ballistic rocket V-2.

In 2004, a number of companies worked on vehicles in this class as entrants to the Ansari X Prize competition. The Scaled Composites SpaceShipOne was officially declared by Rick Searfoss to have won the competition on October 4, 2004, after completing two flights within a two-week period.

In 2005, Sir Richard Branson of the Virgin Group announced the creation of Virgin Galactic and his plans for a 9-seat capacity SpaceShipTwo named VSS Enterprise. It has since been completed with eight seats (one pilot, one co-pilot and six passengers) and has taken part in captive-carry tests and with the first mother-ship WhiteKnightTwo, or VMS Eve. It has also completed solitary glides, with the movable tail sections in both fixed and "feathered" configurations.  The hybrid rocket motor has been fired multiple times in ground-based test stands, and was fired in a powered flight for the second time on 5 September 2013. Four additional SpaceShipTwos have been ordered and will operate from the new Spaceport America. Commercial flights carrying passengers were expected in 2014, but became cancelled due to the disaster during SS2 PF04 flight. Branson stated, "[w]e are going to learn from what went wrong, discover how we can improve safety and performance and then move forwards together."

Scientific experiments
A major use of sub-orbital vehicles today is as scientific sounding rockets. Scientific sub-orbital flights began in the 1920s when Robert H. Goddard launched the first liquid fueled rockets, however they did not reach space altitude. In the late 1940s, captured German V-2 ballistic missiles were converted into V-2 sounding rockets which helped lay the foundation for modern sounding rockets. Today there are dozens of different sounding rockets on the market, from a variety of suppliers in various countries. Typically, researchers wish to conduct experiments in microgravity or above the atmosphere.

Sub-orbital transportation
Research, such as that done for the X-20 Dyna-Soar project suggests that a semi-ballistic sub-orbital flight could travel from Europe to North America in less than an hour.

However, the size of rocket, relative to the payload, necessary to achieve this, is similar to an ICBM. ICBMs have delta-v's somewhat less than orbital; and therefore would be somewhat cheaper than the costs for reaching orbit, but the difference is not large.

Due to the high cost of spaceflight, suborbital flights are likely to be initially limited to high value, very high urgency cargo deliveries such as courier flights, military fast-response operations or space tourism.

The SpaceLiner is a hypersonic suborbital spaceplane concept that could transport 50 passengers from Australia to Europe in 90 minutes or 100 passengers from Europe to California in 60 minutes. The main challenge lies in increasing the reliability of the different components, particularly the engines, in order to make their use for passenger transportation on a daily basis possible.

SpaceX is potentially considering using their Starship as a sub-orbital point-to-point transportation system.

Notable uncrewed sub-orbital spaceflights
 The first sub-orbital space flight was on 20 June 1944, when MW 18014, a V-2 test rocket, launched from Peenemünde in Germany and reached 176 kilometres altitude.
 Bumper 5, a two-stage rocket launched from the White Sands Proving Grounds.
 Albert II, a male rhesus macaque, became the first mammal in space on 14 June 1949 in a sub-orbital flight from Holloman Air Force Base in New Mexico to an altitude of 83 miles (134 km) aboard a U.S. V-2 sounding rocket. 
 USSR — Energia, 15 May 1987, a Polyus payload which failed to reach orbit; this was the most massive object launched into sub-orbital spaceflight to date.

Crewed sub-orbital spaceflights
Above 100 km (62.14 mi) in altitude.

Future of crewed sub-orbital spaceflight
Private companies such as Virgin Galactic, Armadillo Aerospace (reinvented as Exos Aerospace), Airbus, Blue Origin and Masten Space Systems are taking an interest in sub-orbital spaceflight, due in part to ventures like the Ansari X Prize. NASA and others are experimenting with scramjet-based hypersonic aircraft which may well be used with flight profiles that qualify as sub-orbital spaceflight. Non-profit entities like ARCASPACE and Copenhagen Suborbitals also attempt rocket-based launches.

See also

 Canadian Arrow
 CORONA
 DH-1 (rocket)
 Interorbital Systems
 Land of the Giants
 List of rocket launch sites
 Lunar Lander Challenge
 McDonnell Douglas DC-X
 Office of Commercial Space Transportation
 Project Morpheus NASA program to continue developing ALHAT and Q­ landers
 Quad (rocket)
 Reusable Vehicle Testing program by JAXA
 Rocketplane XP
 Spaceport
 SpaceX reusable launch system development program
 Supersonic transport
 XCOR Lynx

References